Anthony Bryce Marlatt (born March 29, 1977) is an American Republican politician who served in the Oklahoma Senate from 2009 until his resignation in 2017.

Biography
Marlatt was born in Shattuck, Oklahoma. He graduated from Northwestern Oklahoma State University in 2003. Marlatt previously worked as a staff member for Representative Frank Lucas and Senator Jim Inhofe.

In 2004, he unsuccessfully ran for the Oklahoma House of Representatives, losing in the Republican primary. He ran for the Senate in 2008 and won; being reelected in 2012 and 2016.

In 2013, Marlatt was named the Oklahoma Independent Petroleum Association's "Legislator of the Year".

Marlatt was elected Majority Caucus Chair in 2014. He was elected Assistant Majority Floor Leader in 2016.

Legal issues
In December 2014, Marlatt was arrested on suspicion of driving under the influence. In June 2015, he pleaded no contest and was sentenced to probation, along with a one-year deferred sentence.

In July 2017, Marlatt was accused of "forcefully grabbing an Uber driver and kissing her neck on June 26 while she drove him to a hotel".

In September 2017, Marlatt was charged with felony sexual battery. After being charged, he resigned from the Senate.

At trial, he pled guilty. In a plea bargain, was sentenced to 90 days probation, fined $500, and paid $50 to the victims compensation fund plus court costs.

Personal life
Marlatt and his wife, Tatum, have 3 children.

Electoral history

References

1977 births
Living people
Republican Party Oklahoma state senators
People from Woodward, Oklahoma
Northwestern Oklahoma State University alumni
21st-century American politicians
People from Shattuck, Oklahoma
Oklahoma politicians convicted of crimes